Gelinbatan is a rural locality (a selo) in Maraginsky Selsoviet, Tabasaransky District, Republic of Dagestan, Russia. The population was 668 as of 2010. There are 3 streets.

Geography 
Gelinbatan is located 26 km east of Khuchni (the district's administrative centre) by road. Maraga is the nearest rural locality.

References 

Rural localities in Tabasaransky District